Bactris coloniata is a clustering palm with stems up to 7m tall. It is found in Colombia, Panama, and Peru. It is threatened by habitat loss.

References

coloniata
Flora of Colombia
Flora of Panama
Flora of Peru
Vulnerable plants
Taxonomy articles created by Polbot
Taxa named by Liberty Hyde Bailey
Plants described in 1933